Vivian Peters-Chukwuemeka (born 4 May 1975) is a Nigerian shot putter and two-time Olympian. She won the gold medal in the shot put at the 2002 Commonwealth Games and has won three consecutive titles at the All-Africa Games from 1999 to 2007. She was the African Champion in the event in 2002, 2006 and 2008. She also competes in discus throw and hammer throw, but not on world level.

Her personal best throw is 18.43 metres, achieved in April 2003 in Walnut. This is the African record.

She competed at the 2000 Summer Olympics and the World Championships in 2003 and 2005 without reaching the finals. She won a silver medal at the 2006 Commonwealth Games.

She graduated from Azusa Pacific University in 2006 with a Bachelor of Social Work.

She received a two-year ban from athletics for a failed drug test at the 2009 Nigerian Championships. Chukwuemeka had an intense stand-off with the Athletics Federation of Nigeria. Her "B" sample had several clerical errors, including inconsistencies in bottle numbers and the meeting at which the sample was taken, and she was refused permission to have a representative present at the second testing in South Africa. She accused Nigerian doping officers of corruption and sexual harassment, as well as accusing the federation president Solomon Ogba of coercing Amaka Ogoegbunam to implicate her in drug distribution. Her claims were dismissed by the appeals panel and her two-year ban from the IAAF remained.

Chukwuemeka returned to competition in 2012 and failed a second drugs test - for the anabolic steroid stanozolol - shortly before the Olympic Games. Subsequently, she was given a lifetime ban from competition.

Achievements

See also
List of doping cases in athletics

References

External links

1975 births
Living people
Nigerian female shot putters
Nigerian hammer throwers
Nigerian female discus throwers
Nigerian sportspeople in doping cases
Female hammer throwers
Athletes (track and field) at the 2000 Summer Olympics
Athletes (track and field) at the 2008 Summer Olympics
Olympic athletes of Nigeria
Athletes (track and field) at the 2002 Commonwealth Games
Athletes (track and field) at the 2006 Commonwealth Games
Commonwealth Games silver medallists for Nigeria
Azusa Pacific University alumni
Doping cases in athletics
Commonwealth Games medallists in athletics
African Games gold medalists for Nigeria
African Games medalists in athletics (track and field)
African Games silver medalists for Nigeria
African Games bronze medalists for Nigeria
Athletes (track and field) at the 2003 All-Africa Games
Athletes (track and field) at the 2007 All-Africa Games
20th-century Nigerian women
21st-century Nigerian women
Medallists at the 2002 Commonwealth Games
Medallists at the 2006 Commonwealth Games